Alison is a unisex given name in English-speaking countries. It was originally a medieval French nickname for Alis, an old form of Alice derived with the suffix -on or -son sometimes used in the former French nicknames. The Middle English form was Alisoun. 

The variant spelling Allison is the most common form in the United States. Other variations include Allisan, Alisson, Allisson, Allyson, Allysson, Alyson, Alysson, Alicen and Alycen, with nicknames Allie, Alley, Alie, Ali, Ally, Aly, Al, Aley and Alli.

Allison also has separate, disputed roots as a family name.

Alison, variant form Alizon, is also a French surname.

Popularity
The name is first recorded in Scotland in the 12th century. It was popular until the early 19th century and, spelled Allison, was the 45th most common name given to baby girls in the United States in 2005 (Allyson was #253; Alison, #259; Alyson, #468; Allie, #256; Ally, #656; and Alice, #414). In 1990 in the United States, Allison was the 228th most popular name for women of all ages; Alison was #347, Allyson, #775; Alyson, #981; Allie, #764; Ali, #2434; and Alice, #51.  Alison in any spelling did not enter the top 100 baby names in 2005 in England and Wales.

Allison last entered the top 1000 baby names for males in the United States in 1946, when it ranked #968. In the 1910s it ranked from 667 to 981 with an average of #835, and in the first decade of the 20th century, it ranked as high as #927.

In Lusophone countries like Brazil and Portugal, Alison and variant forms are also used as masculine given names.

People named Alison

Female
 Alison Balsom (born 1978), British trumpeter
Alison Bechdel (born 1960), American cartoonist
Allison Baver (born 1980), American Olympic Medalist, American Actress
 Alison Becker (born 1977), American actress
 Alison Brie (born 1982), American actress
 Alison Burton (1921–2014), Australian tennis player
 Alison Calder (born 1969), Canadian poet and literary critic
 Alison Chapman-Andrews (born 1942), English-Barbadian painter and artist
 Alison H. Clarkson (born 1955), American politician
 Alison DiLaurentis, fictional character from TV showPretty Little Liars
 Alison Doody (born 1966), Irish actress and model
 Allison Fisher, English professional pool champion
 Alison Fuller, British educational researcher
 Alison Goldfrapp (born 1966), English musician and record producer
 Allison Gollust, American media executive
 Alison Hammond (born 1975), English television personality                 
 Alison Hewson (born 1961), Irish businesswoman and wife of Bono
 Alison Hinds (born 1970), English-Barbadian Soca Musician
 Allison Holker (born 1988), American dancer
 Alison Horner (born 1966), British businesswoman
 Alison Howie (born 1991), Scottish field hockey player
 Alison Humby (born 1972), English badminton player
 Allison Janney (born 1959), American actress
 Alison King (born 1973), English actress
 Alison Kinnaird (born 1949), Scottish musician, sculptor and teacher
 Alison Kosik (born 1971), news journalist for the Cable News Network (CNN)
 Alison Krauss (born 1971), American musician
 Alison Lohman (born 1979), American actress
 Alison Lurie (1926–2020), American novelist and academic
 Allison Mack (born 1982), American actress and criminal
 Alison Marr, American mathematician
 Alison Marsden, American bioengineer
 Alison Mitchell, English sports broadcaster
 Alison Moyet (born 1961), English singer and songwriter
 Allison Munn (born 1974), American actress
 Alison R.H. Narayan (born 1984), American chemistry professor
 Alison Oliver (born 1997), Irish actress
 Alison Parker (1991–2015), American news reporter, murdered on television
 Alison Blomfield Pickmere (1908–1971), New Zealand secretary of the interior
 Alison Pill (born 1985), Canadian actress
 Allison Pohlman (born 1977), American collegiate basketball player and coach 
 Alison Redford (born 1965), Canadian lawyer and politician
 Alison Robins (1920–2017), worked at Bletchley Park "Y-Service"
 Allison Sansom (born 1994), Thai model
 Alison Saunders (born 1961), former Director of Public Prosecutions (England and Wales)
 Allison Scagliotti (born 1990), American actress
 Alison Schumacher (born 2002), Canadian figure skater
 Alison Sealy-Smith (born 1959), Barbadian actress
 Alison Shrubsole (1925–2002), British educationist and university administrator
 Alison Steadman (born 1946), English actress
 Alison Sudol (born 1984), American musician and actress
 Alison Sweeney (born 1976), American actress
 Allison Tant (born 1961), American politician
 Alison Joan Tierney CBE (born 1948) British nursing theorist, nurse researcher
 Alison Weir (born 1951), English author and historian
 Allison Williams (born 1988), American actress, comedian, and singer
 Alison Williamson (born 1971), English archer

Male
 Allison Deforest Pickett (1900-1991), Canadian entomologist
 Alisson Becker (born 1992), Brazilian footballer
 Allison Brooks (1917–2006), American Air Force aviator 
 Allison Burnett (born 1958), American screenwriter
 Alison Cerutti (born 1985), Brazilian beach volleyball player
 Allison Danzig (1898–1987), American sports journalist
 Alison dos Santos (born 2000), Brazilian athlete
 Allison G. Catheron (1878-1950), Canadian-born American politician
 Alison Lopes Ferreira (born 1993), commonly known as Alison, Brazilian footballer
 Allison Blakely (born 1940), American academic historian
 Alison Henrique Mira (born 1995), commonly known as Alison, Brazilian footballer
 Allison Patrício (born 1986), Brazilian footballer
 Alison White (1881-1962), English cricketer
 Allison Green (1911-2005), American politician
 Allison Clark Bonnell (1801-1875), commonly known as A. C. Bonnell, American politician and businessman
 Allison B. Humphreys (1906-1993), former justice of the Tennessee Supreme Court
 Allison Amos Pettengill (1808-1882), American politician and newspaper editor
 Allison Tatham-Warter (1917-1992), commonly known as Digby Tatham-Warter, British Army officer 
 Allison Dysart (1880-1962), Canadian politician, lawyer and judge
 Allison Madueke (born 1944), retired Nigerian naval officer
 W. B. Allison Davis (1902-1983),  American educator, anthropologist, writer, researcher, and scholar 
 Allison DeLong (1940-2014), Canadian politician

Fiction
 Allison Hargreeves, main character in the comic book/Netflix series The Umbrella Academy

 Allison Argent, a character in the TV Series Teen Wolf

See also
 
 
 Alison (disambiguation)
 Allie (given name)
 Allison (surname)
 Allyson (given name and surname)
 Alyson

References

External links

 Popular Scottish Forenames - A

English feminine given names
English unisex given names
English masculine given names
Given names
Indonesian masculine given names
Portuguese masculine given names
Scottish feminine given names